Haemodorum ensifolium is a shrub native to northwestern Australia.

References

ensifolium
Flora of the Northern Territory
Angiosperms of Western Australia
Taxa named by Ferdinand von Mueller